Hotson's jerboa or the Iranian jerboa (Allactaga hotsoni), is a species of rodent in the family Dipodidae. It is found in Afghanistan, Iran, and Pakistan.

Taxonomy
Hotson's jerboa was first described in 1920 by the British zoologist Oldfield Thomas as Allactaga hotsoni.  He named it in honour of the army officer and naturalist John Ernest Buttery Hotson, who collected plants and mammal specimens in Baluchistan during the period 1915 to 1920. The small mammals were sent to Oldfield Thomas for examination; another mammal, Hotson's mouse-like hamster (Calomyscus hotsoni), was also named after its collector.

Distribution and habitat
Its typical habitats are gravel and stony deserts and mountain steppe areas with sparse vegetation.

Behaviour
Hotson's jerboa is a nocturnal, solitary rodent and digs long tunnels in hard ground in which to live. This jerboa feeds on seeds and such desert plants as Artemisia aucheri, Anabasis aphylla and Peganum harmala; it stores pieces of stem and leaf in storage chambers inside the burrow. It has been found that the jerboa is more active at night when the moon is not shining, and at the beginning and the end of the lunar cycle. This is likely to be an anti-predator adaptation connected with its bipedal gait and the scant vegetation in the areas it inhabits.

Status
Hotson's jerboa has a wide range and is presumed to have a large total population. The population trend is unknown, but no particular threats to the animal have been detected and its habitat is of too poor quality to be worth taking under cultivation. Any decline in total population is likely to be small and the International Union for Conservation of Nature has assessed its conservation status as being of "least concern".

References

Allactaga
Mammals of Afghanistan
Mammals of Pakistan
Jerboa, Hotson's
Taxonomy articles created by Polbot
Mammals described in 1920
Taxa named by Oldfield Thomas